Zonitoschema krombeini, is a species of blister beetle endemic to Sri Lanka.

Description
Body length is about 7.8 to 13.7 mm. Head with moderately coarse and moderately dense punctures. Head clothed with short, and moderately dense pubescence. Eyes are moderately large. Clypeus narrow to apex. Pronotum campanuliform and shiny. Pronotum moderately coarse, densely punctured and pubescence is short, and dense. Elytral surface is densely covered with small punctures and short pubescence. Legs are long, and slender. Ventrum yellowish or brownish, and shiny. Ventrum finely punctate, and densely clothed with short pubescence. Male has filiform antennae and broadly emarginate pygidium. Female has emarginate sixth visible abdominal sternum.

References 

Meloidae
Insects of Sri Lanka
Insects of India
Insects described in 1979